Latrodectus lilianae is a species of widow spider commonly found in Portugal and Spain. It is marked with small, white and orange markings on its abdomen near its cephalothorax. It is primarily found in the steppes of the Iberian Peninsula, unlike its American cousins who reside closer to humans. The effect of its venom is currently unknown.

References

lilianae
Spiders of Europe
Spiders described in 2000